"Chapter 5: The Gunslinger" is the fifth episode of the first season of the American streaming television series The Mandalorian. It was written and directed by executive producer Dave Filoni and released on Disney+ on December 6, 2019. The episode stars Pedro Pascal as The Mandalorian, a lone bounty hunter on the run with "the Child" who helps a new bounty hunter.

Plot 
The Mandalorian defeats a pursuing bounty hunter in a dogfight, but the Razor Crest is damaged and he lands at a repair facility run by Peli Motto in Mos Eisley on Tatooine. While seeking work to pay for the repairs in a local cantina, he meets Toro Calican, a young bounty hunter looking to join the Bounty Hunter's Guild by capturing Fennec Shand, a well-trained mercenary. Despite misgivings, the Mandalorian agrees to help him with the bounty, while Calican will take credit for the capture. Peli, meanwhile, has come across "the Child" and begins to take care of it while working on the ship, growing fond of it.

The Mandalorian and Calican travel into the Dune Sea on speeder bikes, looking for Shand. They come upon Tusken Raiders; the Mandalorian barters with them by trading Calican's brand new binoculars for passage. They eventually come across a Dewback with a dead bounty hunter attached to it, which turns out to be bait laid out by Shand to attract anyone looking for her. The two manage to avoid her attacks and capture her, but she manages to destroy one of their speeder bikes in the fight.

The Mandalorian goes to get the Dewback to replace the destroyed speeder, while Calican watches Shand. She tells him that the Mandalorian is a traitor to the Guild and that the bounties on the Mandalorian and the Child are worth a great deal more than her own. Calican is unconcerned with the bounty, but Shand points out that taking out the Mandalorian would make him a legend. She offers to help Calican capture the Mandalorian if he frees her but Calican, assuming that she would betray him, shoots her and heads to the repair facility on the speeder bike, where he captures Motto and the Child. The Mandalorian arrives, uses a flash grenade to stun Calican, and shoots him dead. The Mandalorian then gives Calican's money to Motto to pay for the repairs on his ship and he leaves Tatooine. Out in the desert, a mysterious figure is seen approaching Shand's body.

Production

Development 
The episode was written and directed by executive producer Dave Filoni.

Casting 
Amy Sedaris and Jake Cannavale were cast as Peli Motto and Toro Calican, respectively. At the D23 Expo in August 2019, it was revealed that Ming-Na Wen would appear in the series as Fennec Shand. Additional guest starring actors cast for this episode include Rio Hackford as Riot Mar, Troy Kotsur as a Tusken raider, and Steve Blum as the spaceport operator. Brendan Wayne and Lateef Crowder are credited as stunt doubles for The Mandalorian. Barry Lowin is credited as an additional double for The Mandalorian, while Milly Nalin, Trevor Logan, and Ming Qiu are credited as stunt doubles for Peli Motto, Toro Calican, and Fennec Shand, respectively. "The Child" was performed by various puppeteers. In the episode "Connections" of Disney Gallery: The Mandalorian, it was revealed that Mark Hamill, who played Luke Skywalker in the Star Wars films, provided the voice of the bartender droid EV-9D9.

Music 
Ludwig Göransson composed the musical score for the episode. The soundtrack album for the episode was released on December 6, 2019.

Reception 
The review aggregator website Rotten Tomatoes holds an approval rating of 74% for the episode, with an average rating of 6.5/10, based on 31 reviews. The website's critics consensus reads, "The Gunslinger has flare and nostalgia to spare, but with only three episodes left to go, The Mandalorian lack of forward momentum is starting to feel like narrative wheel spinning."

Alan Sepinwall of Rolling Stone praises the show for "keeping things simple, telling a clear story, and focusing on the strengths of your actors and your production. And The Mandalorian, like its title character, pretty consistently hits its targets. "The Gunslinger" continues this straightforward streak." Keith Phipps of Vulture gave the episode 4 out of 5 and wrote: "Part of what makes the Mandalorian such a compelling character is that he's great at his job but he's never superhumanly great at his job." Katie Rife of The A.V. Club gave the episode a B grade. She was excited at the prospect of seeing Mos Eisley and other callbacks to the original trilogy, but critical of the episode for being just more setup for the larger story arc: "I'm starting to wonder when we're going to get to the main course."

In a negative review, Tyler Hersko, of IndieWire, stated that "Nostalgia is one thing, but the utter dearth of new ideas here just makes the bountiful references a glaring reminder that this has all been done much better before."

Notes

References

External links 
 
 

2019 American television episodes
Fiction set on desert planets
Television shows directed by Dave Filoni
The Mandalorian episodes